The Women's ski cross competition at the FIS Freestyle Ski and Snowboarding World Championships 2019 was held on February 1 and 2, 2019.

Qualification
The qualification was held on February 1 at 15:35.

Elimination round
All racers advanced to the 1/8 finals. From here, they participated in three-person or four-person elimination races, with the top two from each race advancing.

1/8 finals

Heat 1

Heat 3

Heat 5

Heat 7

Heat 2

Heat 4

Heat 6

Heat 8

Quarterfinals

Heat 1

Heat 3

Heat 2

Heat 4

Semifinals

Heat 1

Heat 2

Finals

Small final

Big final

References

Women's ski cross